Uran Khalapur Assembly constituency is one of the 288 Vidhan Sabha (legislative assembly) constituencies in Maharashtra state in western India.

Overview
Uran constituency is one of the seven Vidhan Sabha constituencies located in the Raigad district. and comprises the entire Uran tehsil and parts of the Khalapur and Panvel tehsils of the district.

Uran is part of the Maval Lok Sabha constituency along with five other Vidhan Sabha segments, namely Karjat and  Panvel in the Raigad district and Maval, Chinchwad and  Pimpri in the Pune district.

Members of Legislative Assembly

General elections 2009

See also
 Uran
 List of constituencies of Maharashtra Vidhan Sabha

Notes

Assembly constituencies of Maharashtra
Politics of Raigad district